Tendu is a commune in the Indre department in central France.

Geography
The commune is traversed by the river Bouzanne.

Population

See also
Communes of the Indre department

References

Communes of Indre